Jhansal is an ancient village in Bhadra tehsil of Hanumangarh district in Rajasthan, India. It is located in northeastern corner of the district adjoining Haryana border. It is about 27 km in north-east of Bhadra (Hanumangarh) on Bhadra-Hisar road. As of the 2001 census its population is 5389, with 1419 in scheduled castes. This village is largely inhabited by poonia or punia Jaats.
.
    Other families in this village include Chhimpa, Brahman(Sharma), Saini, Walia, Hooda, Thalor, Jhajhria,and Bhaker

References

External links
Delimitation Commission Report Hanumangarh

Villages in Hanumangarh district